New Guernsey may refer to:
 Nendö Island, the largest of the Santa Cruz Islands, in Solomon Islands
 A fictional state in video game Grand Theft Auto
 A fictional North American province in the novel The Two Georges
 A fictional location next to Gotham City in the television series Batman

See also
 Guernsey, an island in the English Channel
 New Jersey, a US state